Arkansas Constitutional Amendment 91 (known as Issue 1 prior to passage) amended the Constitution of Arkansas to raised sales tax in Arkansas from 6.0% to 6.5% for 10 years to pay for improvements to the Arkansas Highway System. It was referred by the Arkansas General Assembly to voters (legislative referral), and approved by voters during the November 6, 2012 election.

History
Arkansas operated the state highway system debt-free from 1972 until 1999, when voters authorized $575 million in GARVEE bonds for Interstate highway rehabilitation (later known as the Interstate Rehabilitation Program). Arkansas voters reauthorized the IRP in 2011 at the same amount to continue rehabilitating Interstate highway pavements. 

Issue 1 sought to allow issuance of $1.3 billion of four-lane highway construction and improvement bonds, with a sales tax increase used as the revenue stream to pay off the bonds in ten years. The sales tax increase would end once the bonds were paid off. The annual Arkansas Poll indicated support in October, with 53 percent in favor and 42 percent opposed.

Support
The Arkansas State Highway and Transportation Department (AHTD) and Arkansas State Highway Commission strongly supported Issue 1. 

Arkansas House of Representatives and State Highway Commission member Robert S. Moore Jr.
Arkansas State Chamber of Commerce
Lieutenant Governor of Arkansas Mark Darr
 Former Governor of Arkansas Mike Beebe
Frank Scott Jr.
Move Arkansas Forward (major contributors included Walmart's Political Action Committee, Jim Walton, Tyson Foods, and SWEPCO)
Northwest Arkansas Council
U.S. Senator John Boozman

Opposition
Americans for Prosperity, Arkansas chapter 
Washington County Tea Party

Results

The tax went into effect on July 1, 2013. Stephens Inc. issued the bonds for the state.

AHTD Director Scott Bennett later testified to the United States House Transportation Subcommittee on Highways and Transit regarding Issue 1's success.

See also
 Holford bonds

External links
Issue 1 Ballot Issue Fact Sheet University of Arkansas Division of Agriculture Research and Extension Public Policy Center

References

2012 Arkansas elections
2012 ballot measures
Arkansas ballot measures
Road transportation in Arkansas